Torgo may refer to:
Torgo (vampire), in the Marvel Comics universe
Torgo (Marvel Comics robot)
Torgo, a character in the 1966 horror film Manos: The Hands of Fate
Torgo, a parody of the 1966 character in episodes of Mystery Science Theater 3000
Torgo (urban-type settlement), in the Sakha Republic, Russia